Carronella is a genus of sea slugs, aeolid nudibranchs, marine gastropod mollusks in the family Flabellinidae.

Species
There are two species within the genus Carronella:
 Carronella enne Korshunova, Martynov, Bakken, Evertsen, Fletcher, Mudianta, Saito, Lundin, Schrödl & Picton, 2017
 Carronella pellucida (Alder & Hancock, 1843)

References 

Flabellinidae
Gastropod genera